Bangana elegans is a species of fish in the family Cyprinidae. It is found in the Nam Theun basin in Laos.

See also 
 List of near threatened fishes

References

 Bangana elegans at FishBase

Fish described in 1998
Cyprinid fish of Asia
Fish of Laos
Bangana